is a railway station in Taitō, Tokyo, Japan, operated by East Japan Railway Company (JR East). The name relates to a valley where formerly many Japanese bush warblers (uguisu) were found. The station is to the north of the Tokyo National Museum and Ueno Park.

Lines
Uguisudani Station is served by the Yamanote and Keihin-Tohoku lines.

Station layout
The station consists of two island platforms serving four tracks.

Platforms

History
The station opened on 11 July 1912.

Chest-high platform edge doors were installed on the Yamanote Line platforms (platforms 2 and 3) in September 2014, with operation commencing on 18 October 2014.

Station numbering was introduced in 2016 with Nishi-Nippori being assigned station numbers JY06 for the Yamanote line and JK31 for the Keihin-Tōhoku line.

Surrounding area
 Tokyo National Museum
 Ueno Park
 Iriya Station (on the Tokyo Metro Hibiya Line)
 Nezu Station (on the Tokyo Metro Chiyoda Line)

See also

 List of railway stations in Japan

References

External links

 JR East: Uguisudani Station information 

Yamanote Line
Keihin-Tōhoku Line
Stations of East Japan Railway Company
Railway stations in Tokyo
Railway stations in Japan opened in 1912